Connor Michael Smith (born 18 February 1993) is an Irish footballer who plays as a midfielder for National League side Barnet.

Career
Born in Ireland, Smith came to prominence in 2010, finishing as runner-up to Ben Greenhalgh on the television show Football's Next Star. He joined the academy setup at Watford later that year in May, signing a two-year apprenticeship.

In November 2011, Smith joined Isthmian League side Wealdstone on loan until January 2012, along with Britt Assombalonga. In January, the loan was extended for a further two months after the club had remained unbeaten.

Smith signed his first professional contract with Watford in May 2012. His professional debut for Watford came on 18 August 2012, in a 3–2 victory over Crystal Palace in the Football League Championship, replacing Sean Murray as a substitute. On 8 January 2014, Smith signed on loan for Gillingham until the end of the 2013–14 season.

On 1 September 2015, Smith signed for League Two side Stevenage on an initial month loan. Smith left Watford on 21 January 2016 after his contract was cancelled by mutual consent. The next day Smith signed a permanent contract with AFC Wimbledon. Despite only playing 11 games for the Dons, Smith joined Plymouth Argyle. He scored his first goal for Plymouth in an EFL Trophy tie against former club AFC Wimbledon on 4 October 2016.

Having helped Plymouth Argyle to achieve promotion to League One, Smith was released at the end of the 2016–17 season. Following his release by Plymouth, Smith signed for League Two side Yeovil Town on a two-year contract. On 5 July 2018, Smith's contract with Yeovil Town was terminated by mutual consent.

On 6 July 2018, Smith signed for National League side Boreham Wood.

On 4 January 2019, Smith signed for Billericay Town on an 18-month contract. 

Smith then signed for Wealdstone for a second time ahead of the 2019–2020 season.  Smith was part of the Wealdstone side who won promotion to the National League in 2019-20. Smith's first goal in his second stint at the Stones came on 2 March 2021, against his former side Boreham Wood in a 1–0 victory. On 4 June 2021 it was announced that Smith had left the club.

In June 2021, Smith returned to Boreham Wood to take on a player/first team coach role. On 12 July 2022, Smith signed for Barnet on a two-year contract.

Career statistics

Honours
AFC Wimbledon
Football League Two play-offs: 2016

Wealdstone
National League South: 2019-20

References

External links

Ireland stats at UEFA

1993 births
Living people
People from Mullingar
Sportspeople from County Westmeath
Republic of Ireland association footballers
Republic of Ireland youth international footballers
Association football midfielders
Watford F.C. players
Wealdstone F.C. players
Gillingham F.C. players
Stevenage F.C. players
AFC Wimbledon players
Plymouth Argyle F.C. players
Yeovil Town F.C. players
Boreham Wood F.C. players
Billericay Town F.C. players
Kingstonian F.C. players
Kings Langley F.C. players
Barnet F.C. players
English Football League players
Isthmian League players
National League (English football) players
Southern Football League players
Irish expatriate sportspeople in England